The following is a list of all novae that are known to have occurred in 2018. A nova is an energetic astronomical event caused by a white dwarf accreting matter from a star it is orbiting (typically a red giant, whose outer layers are more weakly attached than smaller, denser stars) Alternatively, novae can rarely be caused by a pair of stars merging with each other, however such events are vastly less common than novae caused by white dwarfs.

In 2018, 15 novae were discovered in the Milky Way, 14 being classical novae, and 1 being a dwarf nova of a previously known variable star, V392 Persei, which was discovered in 1972. An additional 23 novae were discovered in the Andromeda Galaxy, 8 in Messier 81, 1 in the Triangulum Galaxy, and 1 in Messier 83. A single luminous red nova was observed in NGC 45.

List of novae in 2018

In the Milky Way

In the Andromeda Galaxy
Novae are also frequently spotted in the Andromeda Galaxy, and are even slightly more commonly found than in the Milky Way, as there is less intervening dust to prevent their detection. Furthermore, Andromeda is circumpolar for observers north of latitude +48-50, roughly the latitude of the Canadian-American border, allowing observers north of that to search for transients all year.

In 2018, 23 novae were seen in the Andromeda galaxy.

In other galaxies
Any galaxy within 20 million light-years of the Sun could theoretically have nova events bright enough to be detected from Earth, although in practice most are only detected in galaxies within 10-15 million light-years of the Milky Way, such as the Triangulum Galaxy, Messier 81, Messier 82, Messier 83, and Messier 94.

In 2018, of the ten novae observed in other galaxies than the Milky Way or the Andromeda Galaxy, eight were in Messier 81, with the remaining two from the Triangulum Galaxy and Messier 83. A luminous red nova, probably caused by the merger of two stars, occurred in NGC 45.

See also
List of novae in 2019
Nova
Dwarf nova
Luminous red nova
Guest star (astronomy)
Supernova

Notes

References

External links
List of all galactic novae

2018 in space
Novae
Novae in 2018
Novae